Pultenaea barbata is a species of flowering plant in the family Fabaceae and is endemic to the south of Western Australia. It is a prostrate or spreading, spindly shrub with hairy, needle-shaped leaves and yellow, red, orange or brown flowers with red or yellow markings.

Description
The flowers are yellow, red, orange or brown with spots and blotches of yellow, red or orange. Flowering occurs from September to December and the fruit is an oval pod.

Taxonomy and naming
Pultenaea barbata was first formally described in 1904 by Cecil Rollo Payton Andrews in the Journal of the West Australian Natural History Society from specimens he collected near the Phillips River in 1903. The specific epithet (barbata) means "bearded", referring to the style.

Distribution and habitat
This pultenaea grows on plains in the Esperance Plains, Mallee and Warren biogeographic regions in the south of Western Australia.

Conservation status
Pultenaea barbata is classified as "not threatened" by the Government of Western Australia Department of Parks and Wildlife.

References

arida
Eudicots of Western Australia
Taxa named by Ernst Pritzel
Plants described in 1904